SGNL›05 is an EP released by Isis which acts as an extension to their earlier full-length album Celestial, as the tracks were all directly culled from the Celestial recording sessions. Frontman Aaron Turner describes them as being “part of the same whole”, separated from each other because releasing a double album for the group's first full-length may have been overbearing for listeners.

Using the style he pioneered with his work in Godflesh and Jesu, Justin Broadrick reinterpreted the title track from Celestial into a new revision. It is presented on this EP as the closing track, an end to this chapter in the Isis discography considering the epic feel and experimental structure of the reworking that clearly foreshadows the direction the band would eventually take musically. The band has performed a version of the song "Celestial" live several times which fuses the original song and this remix together into a massive 16-minute rendition titled "Celestial (Ext/Alt)" on the Live.02 LP.

In addition to the standard CD and vinyl LP editions, SGNL›05 is available in a combined, deluxe release with its companion full-length, Celestial.

Track listing

Personnel

Band members
 Jeff Caxide – bass
 Aaron Harris – drums
 Michael Gallagher – guitar
 Bryant Clifford Meyer – electronics
 Aaron Turner – guitar, vocals, art and graphic construction

Other personnel
 Matt Bayles – audio recording, mixing, producing
 Justin Broadrick – remixing and additional producing
 Dave Merullo – mastering and audio editing
 Jason Hellmann – video stills

References

External links 
 SGNL›05 at Bandcamp (streamed copy where licensed)

Isis (band) albums
2001 EPs
Concept albums
Albums produced by Matt Bayles
Albums with cover art by Aaron Turner
Neurot Recordings EPs